Horse Range  may refer to:

 Horse Range (California) in Nevada County, California, USA
 Horse Range (Nevada) in Nye County, Nevada, USA
 Horse Range (Oregon) in Josephine County, Oregon, USA
 Horse Range (New Zealand), in North Otago, New Zealand